Commentaries on Living: From the notebooks of J. Krishnamurti is a series of books by Jiddu Krishnamurti (1895–1986). It consists of 3 volumes, originally published in 1956, 1958 and 1960.

About the series
During the 1930s and 1940s Krishnamurti was intermittently keeping notes of his philosophical observations, his inner states, his musings about nature, and his discussions with individuals and groups. Aldous Huxley, a longtime friend of his (they first met in 1938), encouraged him to continue writing, and to eventually publish the notes. The resulting series of books, subtitled "From the notebooks of J. Krishnamurti", was edited by Krishnamurti associate Rajagopal Desikacharya (commonly D. Rajagopal).

List

Select editions

Quest Books

Indian subcontinent

Other media
The First Series was released as an audiobook on audio cassette. The whole series is available as an ebook in several editions and formats.

Reviews
 – Review of the 2006 Indian subcontinent edition.

See also
Jiddu Krishnamurti bibliography

Notes

External links
"Commentaries on Living: First Series" – J. Krishnamurti Online [JKO]. Website serial no./id: JKO 179. Krishnamurti Foundations. "J. Krishnamurti Online, the official repository of the authentic teachings of Jiddu Krishnamurti." Retrieved 2011-03-06.

1956 non-fiction books
1958 non-fiction books
1960 non-fiction books
Books by Jiddu Krishnamurti
Philosophy books